Saint-Aventin is a commune in the Haute-Garonne department in southwestern France.

The commune of Saint-Aventin is located in the heart of the Pyrenees, and extends from the Larboust Valley in the north to the Spanish border in the South. The highest point is the Sacroux peek at 2,676 metres. The municipal territory hosts the Luchon-Superbagnères winter sports facilities, accessible only from Bagnères-de-Luchon by road or Cable car.  The village of Saint-Aventin, is located in the Larboust Valley, 52 km south of Saint-Gaudens and 5km west of Bagnères-de-Luchon. The population density is 5.3per/km²

Population

Land Marks
 Luchon-Superbagnères
 La chapelle de Saint-Aventin.
 La vallée du Lis (ou du Lys).

Gallery

Saint Aventin Church
The Romanesque Church Saint-Aventin dates from the 11th or 12th century, has two bell towers, a porch decorated with sculptures, and capitals showing scenes of the life and martyrdom of saint Aventin. The exterior walls have incorporated stone from previous buildings that reuse of stelae and pagan altars dedicated to Pyrenean gods, including Abellio and Aherbelst. Inside the church are monumental paintings, a baptismal font and a wrought iron altar. The Church has been classified historical monument since 1840.

See also
Communes of the Haute-Garonne department

References

Communes of Haute-Garonne